Lechmere was a Massachusetts-based retail company.

Lechmere may also refer to:

People
 Lechmere (surname)
 Lechmere, a fictional character in Benjamin Britten's 1971 opera Owen Wingrave, and in the short story by Henry James on which it was based

In and around East Cambridge, Massachusetts
 Lechmere Canal, connecting to the Charles River
 Lechmere Point Corporation Houses, listed on the National Register of Historic Places
 Lechmere Square, at the intersection of Cambridge Street and First Street
 Lechmere station, a stop on the Green Line of the Massachusetts Bay Transit Authority
 Lechmere Viaduct, connecting to the West End neighborhood of Boston
 Lechmere Warehouse station, a former railroad stop in Woburn, Massachusetts

Other
 Lechmere baronets, a title in the United Kingdom, established in 1818
 Lechmere, Inc. v. NLRB, a 1992 case heard by the Supreme Court of the United States